Neophytus IV was Ecumenical Patriarch of Constantinople (November 27, 1688 – March 7, 1689). He was previously bishop of Adrianople.

Sources
Οικουμενικό Πατριαρχείο
Εγκυκλοπαίδεια Μείζονος Ελληνισμού

17th-century Ecumenical Patriarchs of Constantinople
Bishops of Adrianople